The Wayside Inn, once known as the Cutter House, is a historic house in Arlington, Massachusetts. The house was built circa 1750 in a simple Georgian style, and is the only half-house of that period still extant in Arlington.  The house may have been used as stagecoach stop; it was owned in the 19th century by Philip Whittemore, who also owned a hotel nearer the center.  The name "Wayside Inn" was not applied to the building until the 20th century.

The house was listed on the National Register of Historic Places in 1985.

See also
National Register of Historic Places listings in Arlington, Massachusetts

References

Houses on the National Register of Historic Places in Arlington, Massachusetts
Houses in Arlington, Massachusetts